GTA Teleguam (GTA) is the principal telecommunications company in Guam, providing telephone, cellular, internet and television services to residents of the island. The firm is based in Tamuning.

The majority owner of GTA Teleguam is the Japanese firm Advantage Partners LLP, through its private equity investment funds. Advantage completed the purchase of GTA in 2011 following approval of the deal by the United States Federal Communications Commission and the Guam Public Utilities Commission. The president and chief executive officer of GTA is Roland Certeza

References

External links
http://www.gta.net

Communications in Guam
Companies of Guam